Östra Husby is a Village situated in Norrköping Municipality, Östergötland County, Sweden with 904 inhabitants in 2020. Östra Husby is situated 22 kilometers east of Norrköping and 16 kilometers northeast of Söderköping, Sweden. Östra Husby is the regional centre of Vikbolandet with a supermarket, dentist, medical centre, library and a primary school. There is also a sports club (Bråvalla IK) and a theater group (Vikbolandsspelen).

Associations 
Bråvalla IK

Vikbolandsspelet

Bygdegård

Vikbolandets Företagsgrupp

Images from Östra Husby

References 
2. https://wfnkstat.norrkoping.se/approot/nk_webstat/nkstat.html?OMR=BEF02

Populated places in Östergötland County
Populated places in Norrköping Municipality